Sundaram Nainar Sundaram (3 August 1932 – September 2001) was an Indian Judge and former Chief Justice of the Gujarat and Telangana High Court.

Career
Nainar Sundaram was born in 1932 in Tirunelveli. His father Herbert Sundaram was a District and Sessions Judge. He studied from Anderson High School of Kanchipuram and P.S. Higher Secondary School. He graduated from Loyola College, Chennai and obtained his law degree from Madras Law College. In 1955, Nainar Sundaram started practice in civil and criminal side in the Madras High Court. On 4 January 1978 he was appointed an additional Judge of Madras High Court. Nainar Sundaram was elevated to the post of the Chief Justice of Gujarat High Court on 15 June 1992. Thereafter he became the Chief Justice of the Telangana High Court in December 1993. Justice Nainar Sundaram was appointed the first Chairperson of State Human Rights Commission Tamil Nadu after retirement.

References

1932 births
2001 deaths
Indian judges
20th-century Indian judges
Judges of the Madras High Court
Chief Justices of the Gujarat High Court
Chief Justices of the Telangana High Court
People from Tirunelveli
Loyola College, Chennai alumni